The Sydney Sirens are an ice hockey team in the Australian Women's Ice Hockey League. The team is based in Sydney, Australia.

History
The Sydney Sirens were one of the four founding teams in the Australian Women's Ice Hockey League, which began in 2007. From 2011 to 2013 the Sydney Sirens were known as the North Star Sirens but reverted to their original name which they presently use. On 7 September 2015 the Sydney Sirens announced that they would be moving from their former home rink Sydney Ice Arena to the Canterbury Olympic Ice Rink and were hoping to expand their fan base in the inner western suburbs of Sydney.

Logo and Uniform
The uniform is coloured black, with red stars and a logo that adds yellow. The logo depicts a mermaid, or siren, characters of Greek mythology.

Players

Current roster
For the 2016–17 AWIHL season

Captains
 2011–12 Kaylee White (C), Amelia Matheson (A), Anna Ruut (A)
 2012–13 Kaylee White (C), Amelia Matheson (A), Sharna Godfrey (A)
 2013–14 Kaylee White (C), Amelia Matheson (A), Sharna Godfrey (A)
 2014–15 Kaylee White (C), Stephenie Cochrane (A), Amelia Matheson (A)
 2015–16 Amelia Matheson (C), Stephenie Cochrane (A), Krista Murphy (A)
 2016–17 Amelia Matheson (C), Stephenie Cochrane (A), Krista Murphy (A)
 2019–20 Stephenie Cochrane (C), Sarah Edney (A), Kath McOnie (A)

Coaches
 2015–16 Troy Morgan Coach, Jeff Helbren Coach
 2016–17 Troy Morgan Coach, Jeff Helbren Coach
 2017–18 Jeff Helbren Coach, Troy Morgan Coach
 2018–19 Jeff Helbren Coach, James Hammond Coach
 2010–20 Jayden Ryan (Head), Kaylee Reitsma (Asst.), Don MacDonald (Asst.)

See also

Ice Hockey Australia
Joan McKowen Memorial Trophy
Australian Ice Hockey League
Australian Junior Ice Hockey League
Jim Brown Trophy
Goodall Cup
Women's ice hockey in Australia

References

External links 
Australian Women's Hockey League Official Site
Adelaide Rush Official Site
Brisbane Goannas Official Site
Melbourne Ice Official Site
Sydney Sirens Official Site

Women's ice hockey in Australia
Ice hockey clubs established in 2005
Sporting clubs in Sydney
2005 establishments in Australia
Ice hockey teams in Australia
Women's sports teams in Australia
Women's ice hockey teams
Australian Women's Ice Hockey League